Sebastolobini is a tribe of marine ray-finned fishes belonging to the subfamily Sebastinae of the family Scorpaenidae in the order Scorpaeniformes. Many species have the common name thornyhead.

Taxonomy
Sebastolobini was first formally recognised as a grouping in 1943 by the Japanese ichthyologist Kiyomatsu Matsubara. Authorities who treat the clade referred to as Sebastinae as a family treat the Sebastolobini as a subfamily and call this grouping Sebastolobinae.

Genera
Sebastini contains three genera with 11 species, most in Trachyscorpia.

 Adelosebastes Eschmeyer,  T. Abe & Nakano, 1979
 Sebastolobus Gill, 1881
 Trachyscorpia Ginsburg, 1953

References

 
Sebastinae
Taxa named by Kiyomatsu Matsubara
Fish tribes